Rena D. Newell is the Passamaquoddy tribal representative to the Maine House of Representatives. As of February 2020, she is serving her second two-year term and is the only tribal representative in the Maine House.

Maine House of Representatives
Newell identifies as a political independent. She serves on the Judiciary Committee. Since the Penobscot and Maliseet tribes have opted not to send representatives to the legislature as of 2017 and 2019, respectively, Newell is the only tribal representative as of the 129th and 130th Maine Legislature. Tribal representatives do not have a vote but can introduce and co-sponsor legislation relating to their tribes.

Newell advocated in favor of ending the use of Native Americans as mascots in Maine, and in May 2019 Governor Janet Mills signed  a bill banning the use of Native American mascots in Maine public schools into law. Newell described the new law as a step toward "promoting cultural diversity and awareness” that would help Maine residents remember to treat each other as equals.

In January 2020, Newell stood beside Mills as Mills announced a posthumous pardon for long-time tribal attorney Don Gellers.

In a December 2020 Maine Beacon piece highlighting positive events throughout the calendar year, Newell praised the formation of the Wabenaki Alliance, a group "dedicated to building political power and educating Mainers about the need for full recognition of tribal sovereignty." She explained that the its on policymaking, especially in the continued efforts of Maine's indigenous tribes to pursue tribal sovereignty, was a positive step for tribal relations with the state.

Newell has supported tribal sovereignty legislation as a step toward securing clean water for Passamaquoddy Pleasant Point Reservation; or Sipayik in the Malecite-Passamaquoddy language, whose drinking water has frequently contained unsafe levels of trihalomethanes since 1974.

In February 2021, Newell introduced a proposal that would establish a permanent Wabanaki representative on the advisory council of the Maine Department of Inland Fisheries and Wildlife. She also testified in support of LD 2, "An Act To Require the Inclusion of Racial Impact Statements in the Legislative Process" in Maine, stating

Personal life
Newell has a Bachelor of Science in business from the University of Maine at Machias and was the Passamaquoddy tribal education director. She has 2 children and 3 grandchildren.

See also
Passamaquoddy
Passamaquoddy Pleasant Point Reservation
Passamaquoddy Indian Township Reservation
Wabanaki Confederacy
Maine House of Representatives

References

External links
Legislative page
Rena Newell on Ballotpedia

21st-century American politicians
Living people
Maine Independents
Passamaquoddy people
Members of the Maine House of Representatives
Native American people from Maine
Native American state legislators in Maine
Year of birth missing (living people)
21st-century American women politicians
Women state legislators in Maine
21st-century Native American women
21st-century Native American politicians